Puketapu is a Māori language word meaning sacred hill, and may refer to:

People 

 Erenora Puketapu-Hetet (1941–2006), weaver
 Ihaia Puketapu (1887–1971), Te Āti Awa leader
 Ihakara Puketapu, Te Āti Awa leader (son of Ihaia Porutu Puketapu)
 Jean Puketapu (1931–2012), Māori language activist
 Priyani Puketapu (born 1990), beauty queen

Places
Puketapu (Otago), a prominent hill above the town of Palmerston
Puketapu, Hawke's Bay, a rural community in the Hastings District

Schools

 Puketapu School in New Plymouth
 Puketapu School in Hawkes Bay

Other

 Puketapu Radio based in Palmerston, New Zealand